Saint Regis Pond is a  pond, the largest in the Saint Regis Canoe Area in the Adirondacks in northern New York state.  It drains into the west branch of the St. Regis River.  It is part of the "Seven Carries" canoe route.

There are four small islands and several designated campsites. Saint Regis Pond can only be reached by one or more carries from other ponds in the Canoe Area; the shortest route is via a  carry from Little Clear Pond after a  paddle from the parking area on Floodwood Road.

References

External links
MoshannonFalls - Saint Regis Canoe Area

Adirondack Park
Ponds of New York (state)
Protected areas of Franklin County, New York
Bodies of water of Franklin County, New York